65489 Ceto, as a binary also (65489) Ceto/Phorcys, is a binary trans-Neptunian object (TNO) discovered on March 22, 2003, by Chad A. Trujillo and Michael Brown at Palomar. It is named after the sea goddess Ceto from Greek mythology.  It came to perihelion in 1989.

Physical characteristics 

65489 Ceto is an example of a close binary TNO system in which the components are of similar size.

The binary nature of Ceto enables direct calculation of the system mass, allowing estimation of the masses of the components and providing additional constraints on their composition. Phorcys has a mass of about 1.67×1018 kg. Unless the bodies are porous, the density is consistent with rock–ice composition, with rock content around 50%.

It has been suggested that tidal forces, together with other potential heat sources (e.g. collisions or 26Al decay) might have raised the temperature sufficiently to crystallise amorphous ice and reduce the void space inside the object.
The same tidal forces could be responsible for the quasi-circular orbits of the components of Ceto.

Ceto is listed on Michael Brown's website as possibly a dwarf planet.

Satellite

Ceto's satellite was identified as a binary on April 11, 2006, by K. Noll, H. Levison, W. Grundy and D. Stephens using the Hubble Space Telescope; the object was named Phorcys, formally (65849) Ceto I Phorcys, after the Greek sea god. Using an extended definition of a centaur as an object on a non-resonant (unstable) orbit with its perihelion inside the orbit of Neptune,
the Ceto system can be considered the second known binary centaur.

See also
List of Solar System objects by size

References

External links 
 Binary asteroids at johnstonsarchive
 

065489
Centaurs (small Solar System bodies)
Discoveries by Chad Trujillo
Discoveries by Michael E. Brown
Named minor planets
Binary trans-Neptunian objects
20030322